My Present Age is the title of a Canadian novel by Guy Vanderhaeghe which was first published in 1984.

This was Vanderhaeghe's first full-length novel after his Governor General's Award-winning debut, the short story collection Man Descending. My Present Age is a continuation of one of the short stories from that earlier volume, "Sam, Soren and Ed", and focuses on the character of Ed. In the novel, Ed is trying to reclaim his life after his wife, Victoria, leaves him. But when he learns that Victoria might be in trouble, he becomes torn as to whether to help her or not.

1984 Canadian novels
Novels by Guy Vanderhaeghe
Novels set in Saskatchewan
1984 debut novels